Lacour or LaCour may refer to:

Places
 Lacour, commune in southern France
 Lacour, Louisiana, community in the U.S.
 Lacour-d'Arcenay, commune in eastern France

People
 Paul-Armand Challemel-Lacour (1827-1896), French statesman
 Josephine White deLacour (1849-1929), American physician, suffragist
 Alice Vassar LaCour (1870s – 1924), American educator, singer
 Edmund G. LaCour Jr. (born 1985), American lawyer
 Fred LaCour (1938-1972), American professional basketball player
 Georges Lacour-Gayet (1856-1935), French historian
 Guillaume Lacour (born 1980), French former professional footballer
 Guy Lacour (1932-2013), French composer
 Joan LaCour Scott (1921-2012), American trade union activist, screenwriter
 José-André Lacour (1919-2005), Belgian novelist, playwright, translator, screenwriter, director
 Lenny LaCour (born 1932), American record producer, songwriter
 Léopold Lacour (1854–1939), French teacher, sociologist, writer, feminist
 Marcelle de Lacour (1896-1997), French harpsichordist, teacher
 Nina LaCour, American author
 Pierre Lacour (1745-1814), French painter
 Pierre Lacour (the younger) (1778-1859), French painter, engraver
 Quentin Lacour (born 1993), French professional footballer
 Reginald B. DeLacour (1886-1948), Adjutant General of the State of Connecticut, U.S.
 Robert Lacour-Gayet (1896-1989), French banking official, historian, author, educator
 Rolf Lacour (1937-2018), German wrestler
 Stéphanie P. Lacour (born c. 1975), French neurotechnologist
 Marie Léopold-Lacour (1859-1942), French feminist activist, journalist, writer